Peach Tree Rascals are a music collective from San Jose, California. The group achieved fame with their song, "Mariposa," which went viral on TikTok. The group has been featured on New Music Friday and has received critical acclaim from Billboard, Pigeons and Planes, and MTV.

The group is composed of singer-rappers Isaac Pech, Tarrek Abdel-Khaliq and Joseph Barros as well as producer and mixer Dominic “Dom” Pizano and creative director Jorge Olazaba.

History 
The group formed as a group of friends in high school, with many of them being second-generation children of immigrants. Pech moved to Khaliq's and Pizano's high school and became a part of their friend group, creating CD's and inspiring the group to create music. A week before their release of "Glide," the group were camping trying to figure out a name, to which Olabaza suggested "Peach Tree Village." Pech suggested that "village" be replaced with "rascals." The group began releasing music in 2018 with the debut single "Glide." 

The group returned in 2019 with the single "Plus," moving in together. On August 27, 2019, the group released the song "Mariposa," which went viral on TikTok, being used for more than 1.6 million videos. 

In 2020, they were signed to 10K Projects and released the single "Deer." In August 2020, the group moved to Los Angeles and released an acoustic version of "Mariposa."

Influences 
The group has been described as mixing alternative jazz, funk, and hip hop with inspiration from Kendrick Lamar, Frank Ocean, the Beatles, and John Mayer.

Discography

Singles

Extended plays

References 

Indie rock musical groups from California
Musical groups from Los Angeles